The 1996 All-Ireland Senior Ladies' Football Championship Final was the 23rd All-Ireland Final and the deciding match of the 1996 All-Ireland Senior Ladies' Football Championship, an inter-county ladies' Gaelic football tournament for the top teams in Ireland.

Monaghan won after a replay, to give Laois a fifth final loss in a row.

References

!
All-Ireland Senior Ladies' Football Championship Finals
All-Ireland
All-Ireland
Laois county ladies' football team matches
Monaghan county ladies' football team matches